Estrela Futebol Clube de Vendas Novas commonly known as simply as Estrela de Vendas Novas is a Portuguese sports club from the city of Vendas Novas, Évora. The club was founded in 1920. It currently plays at the Estádio Municipal Vendas Novas which holds a capacity of 650. The stadium also plays host to the club's reserve and youth team home games. The club currently plays in the Évora Elite League following a third-place in the 2021-22 season.

Honours
Terceira Divisão
 Winners (2): 2005–06, 2010–11
AF Évora Honour league
 Winners (1): 2009–10

References

External links
 Official Site
 Profile at ForaDeJogo
 Profile at ZeroZero

Football clubs in Portugal
Association football clubs established in 1920
1920 establishments in Portugal